Clarissa Mabel Blank (August 5, 1915August 15, 1965) was an American author. She wrote the Beverly Gray mystery series and four other novels.

Biography
Clarissa Mabel Blank was born on August 5, 1915 in Allentown, Pennsylvania to Bessie and Edgar H. Blank. Her father worked as a loom fixer at a silk mill before finding employment at a clothing plant in Germantown; in 1920, 1930 and 1940, his occupation was listed as a "knitter". She attended Herbst Elementary School until she was about ten. Her family then moved to the Olney section of Philadelphia. In contrast to her parents, who each completed nine years of schooling, at the age of 18 Clair had graduated from Olney High School with honors and seen the first four books in the Beverly Gray series published.

Blank attended the Peirce School of Business Administration and took a job in Philadelphia as a typist for the Keystone Pipeline Company, a subsidiary of the Atlantic Refining Company. By 1940, she became a secretary there, and, still living with her parents, earned about $1,500 a year. She joined the American Women's Voluntary Services during World War II, driving Army officers around when they came to town. In 1941, George Elmer Moyer, whom Clair had known growing up in Allentown, moved to Philadelphia; the two married in 1943. Moyer attained the rank of sergeant while serving in the Army for two years, from February 1944 to February 1946, with a year in foreign service bookended by two six-month periods in domestic service. A skilled welder, he was employed at the Budd Company after his military service, working on automobiles, tank construction, Chevrolet fenders, and plastics until his retirement. He also studied mechanical engineering, taking night classes at Drexel University. Blank gave birth to two sons, Robert G. and John C. Moyer, who were born in 1947 and 1953. She died on August 15, 1965, in Philadelphia; her husband died on February 27, 1998.

Other works 
Blank wrote four novels in addition to the Beverly Gray books. The first three, comprising the Adventure Girls Series, were published in 1936 by A. L. Burt, who also published her Beverly Gray series. Though later reprinted by Saalfield, no new Adventure Girls works were ever published. In 1940, Gramercy published Blank's one and only adult novel, Lover Come Back.

At least two manuscripts written by Blank went unpublished. In December 1941, she sent an unsolicited manuscript, Linda Ross at Hamilton, to Grosset & Dunlap. It was rejected for publication four months later, for "there seems to be a strong prejudice against starting a new mystery series with a school background." Blank also wrote an unpublished Beverly Gray novel to follow the final volume, Beverly Gray's Surprise. This work was never printed, as the series was cancelled in 1955. It is possible that a fourth Adventure Girls book was also written, to be titled The Adventure Girls on Vacation. This book was advertised at the end of the third and final book in the series; it is unclear whether Blank actually wrote it, or merely intended it, before the series was cancelled.

The Adventure Girls 
A trilogy by default, The Adventure Girls series was published by A. L. Burt in 1936 and never continued. All works were copyrighted on April 27, 1936, the same day as Beverly Gray on a World Cruise. Although a fourth work was advertised at the end of the third, it was never published; where the Beverly Gray series survived and prospered following the publication of its four part breeder set, The Adventure Girls series was unable to catch on. Purchased by Saalfield Publishing in 1937, the series was entirely shelved until being reissued in the fall of 1942. None of the books had their copyright renewed, and all have thus passed into the public domain.

* Errantly referred to as "K-Bar-O" on the dust jacket

† Advertised by name at the end of the third book but never published.

Lover Come Back 

Representing Blank's short-lived foray into adult literature, Lover Come Back was published in 1940 by Gramercy. It does not appear to have ever been reprinted in novel form, although notifications in The Pittsburgh Press suggest that it was printed in a complete novel section there on April 13, 1941. As a result of this limited print run, Lover Come Back is Blank's scarcest published novel.

Lover Come Back echoes the Beverly Gray series in both plot and writing style. Just as Beverly Gray is a successful screenwriter, playwright, novelist and reporter for the Herald Tribune, Beverly Norcot shares the same vocations (and success) and reports for "The Times" (likely The New York Times). Lover Come Back features a plot driven by events and coincidence. "In its series of mini-climaxes strung together, the book is a soap opera." The book's "major ingredients" consist of:

 "3 auto accidents (2 human, 1 canine)2 shootings1 emergency appendectomy3 witnessing[s] by jealous suitor of girlfriend embracing another man3 reversals of fortune (1 downward, 2 upward)2 sudden disappearances of boyfriends out of the country4 unexpected reunions of same with girlsnumerous reversals of feeling between loversfrequent dashing around by characters in cars, ships, and a planemultiple rendezvous at society parties [and] swanky nightclubs"
Beverly Gray, too, leads "such a life of adventure as would tax the resources of any soap opera heroine." Across the series, Beverly is "kidnapped no less than twenty-six times, attacked by wild animals seven times, trapped in three violent storms, imperiled by three earthquakes, shot at twice (wounded once)." She also suffers "a car crash, flowing lava, a flood, a drugging, a rampaging fire, a plane crash and other assorted tribulations."

References

External links

 

1915 births
1965 deaths
Writers from Allentown, Pennsylvania
20th-century American women writers
American women civilians in World War II